Ealing Independent College is an independent college in West London, located in the borough of Ealing in London.

History
Ealing Independent College was founded in 1992, then named Ealing Tutorial College. It moved to its current premises, close to Ealing Town Hall in 1996. In 1998 the College started to offer GCSE and A-Level retakes, and in 2002 Dr Ian Moores took over as Principal.  The college was inspected by Ofsted in 2010 and was rated 'Outstanding' for its quality of teaching and assessment. The college was acquired by Bellevue Education in 2015.

The parent company is Bellevue Education International Limited. Bellevue bought the school as part of acquisitions driven by funding derived largely from Tarek Obaid, the founder of the oil company PetroSaudi, which has been implicated in the 1Malaysia Development Berhad scandal.

References

External links
Ealing Independent College

1992 establishments in England
Educational institutions established in 1992
Private co-educational schools in London
Private schools in the London Borough of Ealing